Calyptraemalva is a genus of flowering plants belonging to the family Malvaceae.

Its native range is Southern Brazil.

Species:

Calyptraemalva catharinensis

References

Malvaceae
Malvaceae genera